Marla Glen (born January 3, 1960) is an American singer from Chicago, Illinois, United States, who has been based in Germany since 1998.

Life 
Marla, daughter of Dell Glen (American-Jamaican) and Cortez Glen (Mexican-American), grew up on the South Side of Chicago. Glen's father was a blues guitarist, and her grandmother was a gospel singer. Her mother was friends with blues guitarist B.B. King. Marla's mother graduated from the University of Chicago and became a successful banker who worked for Merrill Lynch. Marla's father, an American patriot who joined the military at a young age, became an engineer based in Frankfurt, Germany. 

Like many other children in Chicago's historic Bronzeville neighborhood (also known as the Black Metropolis), who received gifts and inspiration from people like Muddy Waters and B.B. King, Marla was given a toy harmonica as a child, and her musical talent became immediately apparent. She was only 11 years old when she wrote her first song, "Repertoire", a title that has won three gold records and one platinum, and appears on her 1996 release, Love and Respect.

Since 1998, she has been living in Heilbronn in Germany. On July 2, 2004, she entered a civil union with Sabrina Conley but later got divorced.

Career 
As a teenager, Marla Glen set out to pursue her musical career. Information of her early life is documented in the lyrics of "Travel," a song that appears on the breakthrough album, This Is Marla Glen.

Glen won first prize performing at a local Jam-session in New Orleans and was rewarded with a trip to France, where she first performed in front of a European audience. She was invited to stay in Europe, and formed the Marla Glen Band in Niort, France. She released her debut album entitled This Is Marla Glen in 1993 and Love and Respect in 1995 for which she received platinum and gold awards.

Glen talked about her experiences in the music industry and her life in Germany in a German interview in 2002 and the interview was accompanied by a series of photos.

In 1998, Glen went on tour with her 1997 release Our World, and made a strong comeback in 2003, with Friends.

Glen is known for her haunting lyrics, for her fierce commitment to social change and the cause of human unity. Most recently, she has dedicated her time and efforts to the education of children, and was declared the "patron saint" of the Knowledge Festival, organized by Bildung ohne Grenzen (Education without Barriers) in Hamburg, Germany (2007).

Discography 
Albums:

 1993: This is Marla Glen (Disques Vogue)
 1995: Love and Respect (Disques Vogue)
 1997: Our World (Ariola)
 1998: The Best of Marla Glen
 2003: Friends
 2005: Greatest Hits Live
 2006: Dangerous
 2011: Humanology
2020: Unexpected

Notable singles:
"Believer" (1993)
"The Cost of Freedom" (1993)

References

External links
 Marla Glen's official site

1960 births
Living people
Singers from Chicago
American emigrants to Germany
American rhythm and blues singers
American blues singers
Songwriters from Illinois
American women songwriters
American musicians of Mexican descent
American musicians of Jamaican descent
Lesbian singers
Lesbian songwriters
20th-century American women singers
21st-century American women singers
21st-century American singers
American LGBT songwriters
American LGBT singers
LGBT people from Illinois
American lesbian musicians
20th-century American LGBT people
21st-century American LGBT people
Hispanic and Latino American women singers
American lesbian writers